Areopoli (before 1912) is a town on the Mani Peninsula, Laconia, Greece.

The word Areopoli, which means "city of Ares", the ancient Greek god of war, became the official name in 1912. It was the seat of Oitylo municipality. The Greek War of Independence was started at Areopoli on March 17, 1821 by Petros Pierrakos, also known as Petros Mavromichalis, the last bey of Mani. Now Areopoli has grown into a flourishing town.  Its tower houses, constructed with field stones, are distinct from the traditional blue and white buildings that characterize many Greek villages.

Areopoli is situated near the west coast of the Mani Peninsula, 1.5 km from its port Limeni. It is 20 km southwest of Gytheio. There is lively open air market in the main square each Saturday, with a lot of local producers present.

Historical population

Notable people 
 Koulis Alepis (1903-1986), poet
 Dimitrios Kalapothakis, journalist
 Stylianos Pierrakos (Stylianos Mavromichalis) (1902–1981), former Prime Minister of Greece
 Georgios Polymenakos, military officer
 Gregorios Skalkeas (1926-2018), Chancellor of the University of Central Greece

References

See also

 List of settlements in Laconia
Tristessa Areopoli

Populated places in the Mani Peninsula
Populated places in Laconia
East Mani